The 2020 Argentine Primera Nacional, also known as the 2020 Campeonato de Transición Primera Nacional, was the 36th season of the Primera Nacional, the second tier of Argentine football. The season began on 28 November 2020 and concluded on 31 January 2021. The competition was contested by the thirty-two teams that took part in the 2019–20 season, which was suspended and subsequently abandoned due to the COVID-19 pandemic.

Format
The competition was split into two stages: First Promotion and Second Promotion, which in turn, were split into two groups according to the groupings and placements of teams in the previous season. The top eight teams of each group at the time of suspension of the previous season played in the First Promotion stage, where they were split into two groups, while the remaining eight teams from each group played in the first round of the Second Promotion stage. In both stages, the teams were placed in groups according to the ones they were in for the previous season. In the First Promotion stage, each team played against the other teams in their group once, with the group winners playing a final match on neutral ground to decide the first promoted team to the Liga Profesional for the 2021 season.

In the Second Promotion stage, each team also played against the other teams in their group once, with the top two in each group qualifying for a knockout tournament where they were joined by the teams that failed to earn promotion in the First Promotion stage, with the two group runners-up from that stage having a bye to the third knockout round and the loser from the First Promotion final having a bye to the semi-finals. The winners of that knockout tournament earned the second promotion berth to the Liga Profesional.

Club information

Stadia and locations

First Promotion stage

Zone A

Zone B

First Promotion final

Second Promotion stage

Zone A

Zone B

Eliminatory stage

First knockout round
The first knockout round was contested by 16 teams: the 12 teams ranked from third to eighth place in their groups of the First Promotion stage and the top two teams from each group of the Second Promotion stage. In this round, the 16 teams were seeded according to their performance and placements in the previous stage of the competition, with teams coming from the First Promotion stage being given a higher seed, and paired against a rival according to their seed: Team 1 vs. Team 16, Team 2 vs. Team 15 and so on, playing a single match on neutral ground. The eight winners advanced to the second knockout round.

Second knockout round
The second knockout round was contested by the eight winners from the previous stage. In this round, the eight teams were once again seeded according to their performance and placements in the first stage of the competition, with teams coming from the First Promotion stage being given a higher seed and paired against a rival according to their seed, playing a single match on neutral ground. The four winners advanced to the third knockout round.

Third knockout round
The third knockout round was contested by the four winners from the previous stage, as well as the two group runners-up from the First Promotion stage, Platense and Atlético de Rafaela. In this round, the six teams were once again seeded according to their performance and placements in the first stage of the competition, with teams coming from the First Promotion stage being given a higher seed and paired against a rival according to their seed, playing a single match on neutral ground. The three winners advanced to the semi-finals.

Semi-finals
The semi-finals were contested by the three winners from the previous stage, as well as the First Promotion final losers Estudiantes (RC). In this round, the four teams were once again seeded according to their performance and placements in the first stage of the competition, with teams coming from the First Promotion stage being given a higher seed and paired against a rival according to their seed, playing a single match on neutral ground. The two winners advanced to the final.

Final

Season statistics

Top scorers

See also
 2020 Copa de la Liga Profesional
 2020 Torneo Federal A
 2020 Primera B Metropolitana
 2019–20 Copa Argentina

References

External links
 Soccerway
 Ascenso del Interior  
 Interior Futbolero 
 Promiedos  

Primera B Nacional seasons
2020 in Argentine football